Kondhali is a village in Nagpur District, Nagpur Division, Maharashtra, India, about halfway between Talegaon and Nagpur on NH-6. It is 42 km from Nagpur, 17 km from Katol.

Demographics
As per 2011 census population of Kondhali is 11,418 of which 5,814 were male and 5,604 were female.

Culture
As this village is on National Highway people from every part of the country travel through Kondhali.
Most of the people are Hindu, with numerous Muslims as well as a few Christians and Sikhsa Buddhist. Kondhali is famous for Bhajia  (Pyaj Pakode). It is also famous for the high school, Lakhotiya Bhutada High-school for its discipline and quality education having student capacity around 2000 students. Kondhali also have a senior arts and commerce college named ‘Late Rajendrasingh alias BABA Vyas Arts and Commerce College’, since 1993, which helps the locals to get the higher education at their door steps.

Administration
Kondhali is administered by a Gram Panchayat. It is within the Katol Tehsil revenue circle of Nagpur District, the Katol Vidhan Sabha seat and the Ramtek Lok Sabha constituency.

Kondhali has a post office and police station.

Transportation
Kondhali is well connected with Nagpur, Katol, Wardha, Amravati and other part of Maharashtra and country as NH-6 passing through Kondhali. MH SH Kondhali-Katol connecting Kondhali with Katol 17 km north of  the village. Wardha is almost 58 km south of Kondhali.

MSRTC provides regular bus service  from Kondhali to Katol, Nagpur, Wardha, Amravati and many more near by places. Most of the Nagpur-Pune buses are passing through Kondhali.

The nearest railway Station is Katol. The nearest airport in 50 km Nagpur

References

Villages in Nagpur district